John Burn may refer to:

John Burn (bishop) (1851–1896), Anglican colonial bishop
John Burn (rower) (1884–1958), English doctor and rower
John Burn (geneticist) (born 1952), British geneticist and professor of clinical genetics
John Southerden Burn (1798–1870), English solicitor and antiquary

See also 
John Byrne (disambiguation)
John Burns (disambiguation)